José Carlos Barbosa (born October 26, 1964), professionally known as Barbosinha, is a Brazilian politician affiliated with the Progressistas and current Deputy Governor of Mato Grosso do Sul since January 1, 2023.

Career
At the age of 13, Barbosa was the first official hired by the then-new municipal government in Angélica.

In 1989, at the age of 23, he became mayor of Angélica, After his term, he returned to Dourados and worked as a lawyer, banker, and university professor.

In 2014, he was elected state deputy in Mato Grosso do Sul; he took leave from the legislature in 2016 when he was named secretary of the state Secretariat of Justice and Public Security, serving in the position for 20 months. In 2019, he was reelected as state deputy.

Personal life
In 1993, he married Maristela de Castro Menezes, a doctor. The two have a son, José Pedro Menezes Barbosa.

References 

Brazilian politicians
1964 births
Living people